Kok Narr (Kok-Nar) is an extinct Paman language of the Cape York Peninsula, Queensland, Australia.

References 

Paman languages
Extinct languages of Queensland